SMS Stuttgart was a  light cruiser of the Kaiserliche Marine, named after the city of Stuttgart. Stuttgart was laid down at the Imperial Dockyard in Danzig in 1905, launched in September 1906, and commissioned in February 1908.

Stuttgart was used as a gunnery training ship from her commissioning to the outbreak of World War I in August 1914, when she was mobilized into the reconnaissance forces of the High Seas Fleet. There, she saw action at the Battle of Jutland, where she engaged the British cruiser . Stuttgart was not damaged during the battle. She was converted into a seaplane tender in 1918, and after the end of the war, was surrendered to Britain as a war prize in 1920 and subsequently broken up for scrap.

Design

The Königsberg -class ships were designed to serve both as fleet scouts in home waters and in Germany's colonial empire. The Königsberg class was an iterative development of the preceding . All four members of the class were intended to be identical, but after the initial vessel was begun, the design staff incorporated lessons from the Russo-Japanese War. These included internal rearrangements and a lengthening of the hull.

She displaced  at full load. Her propulsion system consisted of two 3-cylinder triple expansion engines powered by eleven coal-fired Marine-type water-tube boilers. Stuttgart had a crew of 14 officers and 308 enlisted men.

The ship was armed with a main battery of ten  SK L/40 guns in single pedestal mounts. Two were placed side by side forward on the forecastle, six were located amidships, three on either side, and two were side by side aft. They were supplied with 1,500 rounds of ammunition, for 150 shells per gun. The ship was also equipped with eight  SK guns with 4,000 rounds of ammunition. She was also equipped with a pair of  torpedo tubes with five torpedoes submerged in the hull on the broadside.

Service history
Stuttgart was ordered under the contract name "O" and was laid down at the Imperial Dockyard in Danzig in 1905. She was launched on 22 September 1906, after which fitting-out work commenced. She was commissioned into the High Seas Fleet on 1 February 1908. After her commissioning into the High Seas Fleet, Stuttgart was used as a gunnery training ship for the Fleet's gunners.

World War I
At the outbreak of World War I, she was mobilized and served with the fleet. After the outbreak of war, she and several other cruisers were tasked with patrol duties in the Heligoland Bight. The cruisers were divided with the torpedo boat flotillas, and assigned to rotate through nightly patrols into the North Sea.

On 15–16 December, Stuttgart participated in the bombardment of Scarborough, Hartlepool and Whitby. She was assigned to the cruiser screen of the High Seas Fleet, which was providing distant cover to Rear Admiral Franz von Hipper's battlecruisers while they were conducting the bombardment.  Following reports of British destroyers from the German screen, Admiral von Ingenohl ordered the High Seas Fleet to turn to port and head for Germany. At 06:59, Stuttgart, the armored cruiser , and the light cruiser  encountered Commander Jones' destroyers. Jones shadowed the Germans until 07:40, at which point Stuttgart and Hamburg were detached to sink their pursuers. At 08:02, however, Roon signaled the two light cruisers and ordered them to abandon the pursuit and retreat along with the rest of the High Seas Fleet.

The operation was commanded by Rear Admiral Hopman, the commander of the reconnaissance forces in the Baltic. IV Scouting Group was tasked with screening to the north to prevent any Russian naval forces from moving out of the Gulf of Finland undetected, while several armored cruisers and other warships bombarded the port. The Russian ships briefly engaged München, but both sides were unsure of the others' strength, and so both disengaged. Shortly after the bombardment, Libau was captured by the advancing German army, and Stuttgart and the rest of IV Scouting Group were recalled to the High Seas Fleet.

Battle of Jutland

Stuttgart was assigned to IV Scouting Group during the Battle of Jutland on 31 May – 1 June 1916. IV Scouting Group, under the command of Commodore Ludwig von Reuter, departed Wilhelmshaven at 03:30 on 31 May, along with the rest of the fleet. Tasked with screening for the fleet, Stuttgart and the torpedo boat  were positioned at the rear of the fleet, astern of II Battle Squadron. Stuttgart and IV Scouting Group were not heavily engaged during the early phases of the battle, but around 21:30, they encountered the British 3rd Light Cruiser Squadron (3rd LCS). Reuter's ships were leading the High Seas Fleet south, away from the deployed Grand Fleet. Due to the long range and poor visibility, only München and Stettin were able to engage the British cruisers. Stuttgart was the fourth ship in the line, and her gunners could only make out one British ship in the haze. Since that ship was already being engaged by the other German cruisers, Stuttgart held her fire. Reuter turned his ships hard to starboard, in order to draw the British closer to the capital ships of the German fleet, but the 3rd LCS refused to take the bait and disengaged.

During the ferocious night fighting that occurred as the High Seas Fleet forced its way through the British rear, IV Scouting Group encountered the 2nd Light Cruiser Squadron at close range in the darkness. Stuttgart and  fired on Dublin. During this period, Dublin was hit by eight shells, probably all from Stuttgart, though these hits did not do serious damage. In the melee, the cruiser  was hit and sunk by a torpedo launched by Southampton; this forced Stuttgart to haul out of line to starboard. She then lost contact with the rest of IV Scouting Group, so she fell in with I Battle Squadron. She was present during a later encounter with British light forces around midnight. She remained concealed in the darkness and observed I Battle Squadron dreadnoughts hammering several British destroyers. The British meanwhile launched torpedoes at the German line, which forced it to turn away.

She led I Battle Squadron back to port, and later assisted III Battle Squadron and the fleet flagship, . In the course of the battle, Stuttgart had fired 64 rounds, the least of all of the German cruisers in the battle. She emerged from the battle unscathed, unlike many of the other German cruisers.

Conversion and fate
Earlier in the war, the German Navy had experimented with converting steamers into seaplane tenders. They were too slow to operate with the fleet, however, and so a faster alternative was needed. By 1918, the Navy had decided to convert Stuttgart, which was fast enough to steam with the fleet; conversion work started in February 1918. The work was done at the Imperial Dockyard in Wilhelmshaven, and was completed in May. As a seaplane tender, her forward and rear 10.5 cm guns, and the two rearmost broadside guns were removed, leaving only four broadside guns remaining. Two 8.8 cm SK L/45 anti-aircraft guns were installed forward; she retained her submerged torpedo tubes. Two large hangars were installed aft of the funnels, with space for two seaplanes; a third seaplane was carried on top of the hangars. Since Stuttgart could carry only three aircraft, a number which was deemed insufficient to support the entire High Seas Fleet, plans were drawn up to convert Roon into a seaplane carrier as well. Neither ship was ever used operationally. Stuttgart survived the war, and was stricken from the naval register on 5 November 1919. She was surrendered to the United Kingdom on 20 July 1920, as the war prize "S" and subsequently broken up for scrap.

Footnotes

References

Further reading
 
 

1906 ships
Ships built in Danzig
Königsberg-class cruisers (1905)
World War I cruisers of Germany
Seaplane tenders